Nordre Isortoq Fjord is a fjord in the Qeqqata municipality in western Greenland.

Geography 
Nordre Isortoq Fjord has its mouth near the Maligiánguit Bay of the Davis Strait.  The head of the fjord is fed mainly by the Naqingnerssuaq Qiterdleq stream, running down from the Isunnguata Sermia glacier of the western Greenland ice sheet.

See also 
 List of fjords of Greenland

References 

Fjords of Greenland